Nancy A. Youssef is an American journalist currently working as a national security correspondent for the Wall Street Journal. She was previously a national security correspondent for The Daily Beast, Buzzfeed News, and McClatchy Newspapers.

She has received awards from Detroit chapter of the Society of Professional Journalists University of Virginia, and Maryland-D.C. Delaware Press Association.

Early life and education
Born to Egyptian parents, Youssef is a first-generation native of the Washington, D.C. area. She speaks fluent Arabic. 

She completed her bachelor's degree in economics from University of Virginia, followed by post-graduate studies at the Johns Hopkins University School of Advanced International Studies. Youssef has a master's degree in Security Studies from Georgetown University’s Edmund A. Walsh School of Foreign Service.

Career
Youssef began her career in journalism at the Baltimore Sun. She then worked at Detroit Free Press, where she covered legal issues. At the Detroit Free Press, Youssef reported on the Iraq war for the media conglomerate, Knight Ridder. She traveled throughout Jordan and Iraq from the start of conflict through the post-war period.

In August 2005, Youssef joined the Washington Bureau at McClatchy. She spent four years covering the Iraq war and served as chief of the Baghdad bureau. Her work focused on the Iraqi citizens, centering on how the U.S. military strategy was influencing the social and political dynamic. Her pieces reflected on the everyday life of the Iraqi people and coverage of civilian casualties.

Then, she served as McClatchy's chief Pentagon correspondent, continuing her coverage of both the conflict in Iraq and in Afghanistan, traveling overseas to report on the latest developments. Youssef also served as president of the Pentagon Press Association. She also served as Middle East bureau chief for McClatchy and covered the events of the 2011 Egyptian Revolution.

In 2014, she joined The Daily Beast as senior defense and national security correspondent. In 2017, she joined BuzzFeed News on the same beat. She also appeared on PBS's Washington Week.

As of 2021, Yousef is the National Security Chief with the Wall Street Journal.

For her journalistic accomplishments, Youssef has been awarded from Maryland-D.C. Delaware Press Association, Detroit chapter of the Society of Professional Journalists, and University of Virginia with Lawrence Hall Award for Distinguished Journalism.

Youssef published her first book, Fear Money Purpose: How to overcome your fears to find financial freedom and your true purpose on June 20, 2019.

References

External links
 Pentagon Press Association
 PBS Profile for Nancy Youssef
 

Year of birth missing (living people)
Living people
American newspaper reporters and correspondents
American women journalists
American people of Egyptian descent
Journalists from Washington, D.C.
University of Virginia alumni
Johns Hopkins University alumni
McClatchy publications
Walsh School of Foreign Service alumni
21st-century American women